Red Album or The Red Album may refer to:

 1962–1966, a 1973 compilation album by The Beatles also known as "The Red Album"
 Days of the New (2001 album), an album by Days of the New often referred to as "The Red Album"
 Grand Funk (album), a 1969 release by Grand Funk Railroad sometimes called "The Red Album"
 The R.E.D. Album, the fourth studio album by rapper Game in 2011
 Red Album (Baroness album), a 2007 album by Baroness
 Красный альбом (Red Album), a 1987 album by Grazhdanskaya Oborona
 The Red Album, a 2008 album by Cantonese singer Stephy Tang
 Aaliyah (album), a 2001 album by Aaliyah often referred to as "The Red Album"
 Sammy Hagar (album), a 1977 album often referred to as "The Red Album"
 Stone Temple Pilots (album), the band's sixth studio album, also known as "The Red Album"
 Weezer (2008 album), Weezer's third self-titled album, also known as "The Red Album"

See also
 Red (disambiguation), section "Albums"
 The White Album (disambiguation)